Hell-Cat Maggie (fl. 1820–1845) was the pseudonym of an American outlaw and early member of the Dead Rabbits. She was a well-known personality in Manhattan's Five Points district and a noted fighter, her teeth reportedly filed into points and her fingers adorned with long, claw-like brass fingernails. She fought alongside the Dead Rabbits and other Five Pointers against rival nativist gangs from the Bowery, most especially the Bowery Boys, during the early 1840s. Although there is little information about her life, she is one of the earliest female outlaws of the "Gangs of New York" era and has been compared to other female outlaws such as Gallus Mag and Battle Annie, the latter leading the female auxiliary of the Gopher Gang during the 1870s.

A composite character based on Hell-Cat Maggie, Sadie the Goat (whose historic existence has been in doubt) and Gallus Mag was played by Cara Seymour in the 2002 film adaptation of Herbert Asbury's The Gangs of New York directed by Martin Scorsese. She was also featured in the 2003 historical novel A Passionate Girl by Thomas J. Fleming.

References

Further reading
Botkin, B.A. New York City Folklore: Legends, Tall Tales, Anecdotes, Stories, Sagas, Heroes and Characters, Customs, Traditions and Sayings. Westport, Connecticut: Greenwood Press, 1976. 
Penhaligon, Tom. The Impossible Irish. London: George Routledge & Sons, 1935.
Petronius. New York Unexpurgated: An Amoral Guide for the Jaded, Tired, Evil, Non-conforming, Corrupt, Condemned, and the Curious, Humans and Otherwise, to Under Underground Manhattan. New York: Matrix House, 1966.

Year of birth missing
American female organized crime figures
Gang members of New York City
People from Five Points, Manhattan
19th-century American women
1845 deaths